This is a list of chief commissioners of Oudh. The establishment of the title of Chief Commissioner of Oudh was created after deposing Nawab of Awadh Wajid Ali Shah and incorporating Oudh into British India by Company in 1856 until it was merged with the title of Lieutenant Governor of the North-Western Provinces and renamed as Lieutenant Governor of the United Provinces of Agra and Oudh in 1877.

Chief commissioners of Oudh (1856–1877) 
In 1856, the office was created.

See also 
 (1732–1857) – Nawabs of Awadh
 (1834–1836) – Governors of Agra
 (1836–1877) – Lieutenant Governors of the North-Western Provinces
 (1877–1902) – Lieutenant Governors of the North-Western Provinces and Chief Commissioners of Oudh
 (1902–1921) – Lieutenant Governors of the United Provinces of Agra and Oudh
 (1921–1937) – Governors of the United Provinces of British India
 (1937–1950) – Governors of the United Provinces
 (1950 – cont.) – Governors of Uttar Pradesh

References 

 Provinces of British India
 The India List and India Office List By India Office, Great Britain

British administration in Uttar Pradesh
History of Awadh
Chief Commissioners